Robert McKee Bashford (December 31, 1845January 29, 1911) was an American lawyer and politician who served as the 25th Mayor of Madison, Wisconsin, and represented Dane County in the Wisconsin State Senate from 1893 to 1897.  He also served briefly as a justice of the Wisconsin Supreme Court in 1908, after the death of Chief Justice John B. Cassoday.

Biography

Born in Fayette, Wisconsin, Bashford graduated from the University of Wisconsin in 1870 and from the University of Wisconsin Law School in 1871. He later received his master's degree from the University in 1874. In 1871, Bashford along with two others purchased the Madison Democrat newspaper, where Bashford was editor until 1876. He then practiced law in Madison, Wisconsin, and served as city attorney from 1881 to 1886. In 1886, he moved to Chicago, Illinois, where he continued to practice law. While his firm was successful, he did not care for the work and moved back to Madison.

In 1890, Bashford became mayor of Madison, defeating Arthur Loomis Sanborn in the April election. During his tenure he assisted the state attorney general to prosecute former state treasurers of Wisconsin to get money they had collected from interest on the deposit of public funds. The state recovered nearly half a million dollars. From 1891 to 1895, he served in the Wisconsin State Senate. He resumed his law practice, including arguing before the United States Supreme Court in the 1905 case of United States v. Stinson, in which he successfully defended a land purchaser from the federal government's attempt to reclaim the land based on accusations of fraud. In 1908, Bashford was appointed to the Wisconsin Supreme Court, but lost a special election for the position four months later. He resumed his law practice and was on the faculty of the University of Wisconsin Law School.

Personal life and Family

Bashford was the son of Reverend Samuel Morris Bashford and his wife, Mary Ann (McKee) Parkinson Bashford.  Bashford's father died when he was only five years old.  His mother remarried to William Pearce Trousdale, who became Bashford's stepfather.

Bashford's first wife was Florence E. Taylor, the second daughter of Wisconsin Governor William Robert Taylor. They had one daughter together before her death in 1886.  Bashford remarried with Sarah Amelia Fuller, who survived him.

Bashford House

His former home, now known as the Robert M. Bashford House, is listed on the National Register of Historic Places.

Electoral history

Madison Mayor (1890)

| colspan="6" style="text-align:center;background-color: #e9e9e9;"| General Election, April 1, 1890

Wisconsin Supreme Court (1908)

| colspan="6" style="text-align:center;background-color: #e9e9e9;"| General Election, April 7, 1908

References

External links
 

People from Fayette, Wisconsin
Lawyers from Madison, Wisconsin
Politicians from Chicago
University of Wisconsin–Madison alumni
University of Wisconsin Law School alumni
Mayors of Madison, Wisconsin
Wisconsin state senators
Justices of the Wisconsin Supreme Court
1845 births
1911 deaths
19th-century American judges
19th-century American lawyers